Ultan Conlon (born 1980) is an Irish singer-songwriter.

Career 
Performed live with John Martyn, Mary Coughlan, Lisa Hannigan, Mark Geary, Roesy, Sabrina Dinan, David Kitt, and the Four of Us. His single of 2005, "Really Gone", featured John Martyn. His song, "Ring Out The Old" featured in the British film, "The Beholder". He and fellow Galwegian, John Conneely, formed the group UltanJohn in 2003 but have since disbanded. Ultan has also shared the stage with Eddi Reader, Jackson Browne and Shelby Lynne.

His first studio album, "Bless Your Heart", was released in October 2009. He is a native of Loughrea. In 2012, Ultan was a composer for the soundtrack for the film 'Songs For Amy' which starred Sean Maguire. His sophomore record "Songs of Love So Cruel" dropped in 2013.

Blogcritics raved Last Days of the Night Owl (2018) is "an elegantly striking album, full of nuanced floating colors and velvety energy, along with the appealing voice of Ultan Conlon."  

Ultan's fourth record 'There's a Waltz' (2020) was produced by Grammy Award-winner Sean Watkins (Nickel Creek). Ultan first met Sean in LA in 2016 while playing some shows with him at Largo, the well-known nightclub where Sean and Sara Watkins hosted the Watkins Family Hour.
Producer Watkins brought many top-notch musicians on board to accompany Ultan including Don Heffington — Drums (Bob Dylan, Lucinda Williams); Sebastian Steinberg — Bass, Double Bass (Neil Diamond, KD Lang); Gabe Witcher — Fiddle (Paul Simon, Beck); Rich Hinman — Pedal Steel (KD Lang, St.Vincent); Sara Watkins — Backing Vocals (I’m With Her); and Tyler Chester — B3, Piano (Jackson Browne, Andrew Bird).  

"Sparks of the Night" was the first single and the official video was premiered by Americana UK where they wrote Conlon's "clear, melodic vocal brings Roy Orbison to mind." The album received critical acclaim and airplay in Ireland on RTE Radio 1 and the BBC in the UK. Hotpress Magazine described There's a Waltz as  "a winning collection...songs of substance told with intelligence and wry observation". On the week of 17 April 2020 RTE Radio 1 deemed Ultan Conlon's 'There's a Waltz' as their album of the week.

References

External links
 http://www.ultanconlon.com
 http://www.advertiser.ie/galway/article/16119

Musicians from County Galway
People from Loughrea
Living people
Irish male singer-songwriters
1980 births
21st-century Irish singers